Mark Taylor may refer to:

Entertainment
 Mark Taylor (animation director) (born 1961), creator of Rubbish, King of the Jumble
 Mark Taylor (Canadian actor) (born 1977), Canadian television actor
 Mark Taylor (drummer) (born 1962), English jazz drummer
 Mark Taylor (French horn) (born 1961), American jazz French horn player
 Mark Taylor (music producer) (born 1962), British record producer and songwriter
 Mark Taylor (sound engineer) (born 1966), sound effects mixer
 Mark L. Taylor (born 1950), American actor and voice actor
  Mark Taylor (Home Improvement), fictional character; youngest son on U.S. TV series Home Improvement

Politics
Mark Taylor (American politician) (born 1957), lieutenant governor of Georgia
Mark Taylor (Australian politician) (born 1967), member of the New South Wales Legislative Assembly
Mark Taylor (Canadian politician) (born 1970), City councillor of Bay Ward in Ottawa

Sports
Mark Taylor (cricketer) (born 1964), Australian cricketer
Mark Taylor (footballer, born 1964), striker who played for Blackpool, amongst other clubs
Mark Taylor (footballer, born 1966), midfielder who played for Walsall, Shrewsbury Town and Hereford United
Mark Taylor (footballer, born 1974), left back who played for Darlington, Fulham and Northampton
Mark Taylor (ice hockey) (full name Mark C. Taylor, born 1958), ice hockey player for the Philadelphia Flyers
Mark Taylor (New Zealand rugby player) (born 1951), New Zealand rugby union player
Mark Taylor (racing driver) (born 1977), British Indy Racing League driver
Mark Taylor (swimmer) (born 1960), British swimmer
Mark Taylor (Welsh rugby player) (born 1973), Welsh rugby union player
Mark Taylor (wheelchair curler) (born 1959), American wheelchair curler

Other
Mark C. Taylor (philosopher) (born 1945), professor of religion at Columbia University, author
Mark John Taylor, New Zealand ISIS fighter
Mark Lewis Taylor (born 1951), professor of theology
Mark P. Taylor (born 1958), professor of economics at the University of Warwick
Mark Taylor, subject of the film The Trump Prophecy

See also 
Mick Taylor (disambiguation)